Vayssierea is a genus of sea slugs, dorid nudibranchs, shell-less marine gastropod mollusks in the family Okadaiidae. The exact relationship of this genus of nudibranchs is still unclear.

Species 
Species in the genus Vayssierea include:
 Vayssierea caledonica Risbec, 1928
 Vayssierea cinnabarea Ralph, 1944
 Vayssierea elegans (Baba, 1930)
Vayssierea felis (Collingwood, 1881)

References

Okadaiidae